Mitiamo is a town in northern Victoria, Australia. At the 2016 census, Mitiamo had a population of 117.

Mitiamo Post Office opened on 13 April 1875. Mitiamo station opened in 1883 with the arrival of the Yungera line.

The town has an Australian Rules football and Netball Club competing in the Loddon Valley Football Netball League.

Golfers play at the course of the Mitiamo Golf Club on Mitiamo Forest Road.

References

External links

Towns in Victoria (Australia)
Shire of Loddon